Denys Valeriyovych Teslyuk (born 11 April 2003) is a Ukrainian professional footballer who plays as a centre-forward for Ukrainian club Volyn Lutsk.

References

External links
 Profile on Volyn Lutsk official website
 

2003 births
Living people
Footballers from Lutsk
Ukrainian footballers
Association football forwards
FC Volyn Lutsk players
Ukrainian First League players
Ukrainian Second League players
Sportspeople from Volyn Oblast